Panfilov Street, is a street in Bishkek, Kyrgyzstan. It stretches from Abdylas Maldybaev Street in the south to Jibek Jolu Prospekti in the north. The street was named after Soviet general Ivan Panfilov in 1941. Its earlier name was Sadovaya Street (Garden Street), originating from the Kazenniy Sad (Public Garden).

References

Buildings and structures in Bishkek
Streets in Kyrgyzstan
Transport in Bishkek